Richard Alan Nichols FLS is Professor of Evolutionary Genetics at Queen Mary University of London. He is known for the Balding–Nichols model.

He graduated with a first-class degree in zoology from University College London in 1981 and completed his PhD at the University of East Anglia in 1984 under the supervision of Godfrey Hewitt.

References

Year of birth missing (living people)
Living people
Alumni of University College London
Alumni of the University of East Anglia
Academics of Queen Mary University of London
Fellows of the Linnean Society of London